Eugene Lee is an American actor. He has appeared in work in Asia and in the United States. He hosted the show Popcorn Zen on the American cable network AZN TV. In 2006, he starred in a Singapore TV sitcom called ABC DJ, an English-language fish-out-of-water show. He played the lead role of a DJ from Orange County who goes to live with his uptight, traditionalist family in Asia. Most recently, Lee hosted an international music competition program for bands and singer/songwriters, airing throughout Asia, called "Sutasi."

Eugene grew up in Huntington Beach, California. He attended Dwyer Middle School (1992–1995) and Huntington Beach High School (1995–1999). He currently resides in Los Angeles, California, in the Los Feliz neighborhood.

Television
Popcorn Zen (2004) as host
Cooleyville (2005) Voice Over Artist
ABC DJ (2006) as DJ (Dong-Jin)
Sutasi (2008) as host                Asia Sounds Film and TV

Film
Sadly, Too Late			        Lead			Dir. Harrison Lee
Wait for Me 			        Lead			Dir. Daniel Zhao
Aloha, My Love			        Lead			Dir. Changkyu Lee
Love Sucks: 2006			Lead			Dir. David Woo
Remedy			        	Featured		        Dir. Karl T. Hirsch

Web
Racism: Coloring our Food      Lead                        Dir. Derek Mehn
By the Fireside                           Host

Production
Save the Whales Please: The Trailer             Producer, Director
Rude Awakening                                             Producer
By the Fireside                                                 Producer

References

External links
 

Year of birth missing (living people)
Living people
Male actors from Orange County, California
Television personalities from Los Angeles
American male child actors
American male television actors
Male actors from California
American male actors of Korean descent
21st-century American male actors
People from Huntington Beach, California
Male actors from Los Angeles